The Durbin–Wu–Hausman test (also called Hausman specification test) is a statistical hypothesis test in econometrics named after James Durbin, De-Min Wu, and Jerry A. Hausman. The test evaluates the consistency of an estimator when compared to an alternative, less efficient estimator which is already known to be consistent. It helps one evaluate if a statistical model corresponds to the data.

Details
Consider the linear model y = Xb + e, where y is the dependent variable and X is vector of regressors, b is a vector of coefficients and e is the error term. We have two estimators for b: b0 and b1. Under the null hypothesis, both of these estimators are consistent, but b1 is efficient (has the smallest asymptotic variance), at least in the class of estimators  containing b0. Under the alternative hypothesis, b0 is consistent, whereas b1 isn't.

Then the Wu–Hausman statistic is:

 

where † denotes the Moore–Penrose pseudoinverse. Under the null hypothesis, this statistic has asymptotically the chi-squared distribution with the number of degrees of freedom equal to the rank of matrix .

If we reject the null hypothesis, it means that b1 is inconsistent. This test can be used to check for the endogeneity of a variable (by comparing instrumental variable (IV) estimates to ordinary least squares (OLS) estimates). It can also be used to check the validity of extra instruments by comparing IV estimates using a full set of instruments Z to IV estimates that use a proper subset of Z. Note that in order for the test to work in the latter case, we must be certain of the validity of the subset of Z and that subset must have enough instruments to identify the parameters of the equation.

Hausman also showed that the covariance between an efficient estimator and the difference of an efficient and inefficient estimator is zero.

Derivation

Assuming joint normality of the estimators.

 

Consider the function : 

By the delta method
 

Using the commonly used result, showed by Hausman, that the covariance of an efficient estimator with its difference from an inefficient estimator is zero yields 

 

The chi-squared test is based on the Wald criterion

 

where † denotes the Moore–Penrose pseudoinverse

Panel data
The Hausman test can be used to differentiate between fixed effects model and random effects model in panel analysis. In this case, Random effects (RE) is preferred under the null hypothesis due to higher efficiency, while under the alternative Fixed effects (FE) is at least as consistent and thus preferred.

See also
Regression model validation
Statistical model specification

References

Further reading
 
 
 
 
 

Econometric modeling
Statistical tests